In the United States military, 174th Brigade may refer to:

 Air Defense Artillery
174th Air Defense Artillery Brigade (United States), a major subordinate command of the Ohio Army National Guard located in Columbus, Ohio.

 Infantry
174th Infantry Brigade (United States), a U.S. Army Reserve training brigade located at Fort Drum, New York.

In the British military, 174th Brigade may refer to 174th (2/2nd London) Brigade.